Desmond Dominque Jennings (October 4, 1971 – November 16, 1999) was an American serial killer who killed at least five people in drug-related robberies in 1993. While officials only conclusively proved his guilt in five murders, they suspected him in as many as twenty.

Early adult life 
Before the murders, Jennings had worked as a nursing aide.

Murders, arrest, and trial 
In October 1993, Jennings, John Freeman, Robert Anderson, and two others were involved in a fatal robbery at a drug house in Fort Worth. On December 24, 1993, Jennings and Freeman killed two people at a house in Fort Worth. On December 27, 1993, Jennings and Freeman entered a house in Fort Worth. Inside, when Sylvester Walton, 44, asked the two what they wanted, Jennings shot him in the face, killing him. As they moved further into the house, they saw Wonda Matthews, 27, rising up on a bed. Jennings shot her in the head. Jennings then returned to Walton and checked his body, stealing a pouch. As Jennings and Freeman were leaving the house, Jennings heard Matthews moaning, so he returned and shot her a second time.

Several days later, Freeman was arrested as he was driving a car which matched a report's description of a vehicle used in a robbery. When the car was searched, a loaded .32-caliber handgun was found in the trunk. Ballistics testing matched the bullets to those found in the bodies of Walton and Matthews.

In 1995, Jennings was convicted of two counts of capital murder for killing Walton and Matthews and sentenced to death. John Freeman was convicted of murder and sentenced to 30 years in prison.

Execution 
Jennings was executed by lethal injection on November 17, 1999. He declined a last meal. On the day of his execution, Jennings warned guards that he would resist his execution. After refusing to voluntarily leave his cell, prison officials incapacitated him with pepper spray. When the time of his execution came, Jennings resisted once more and had to be forcibly removed from his holding cell by a five-man team. It was the first time since Texas reinstated capital punishment in the 1970s that prison officials had to forcibly move a death row inmate due to them refusing to cooperate. When the warden asked Jennings if he had a last statement, he said, "No, I do not." Jennings was pronounced dead at 6:22 PM.

See also 
 Capital punishment in Texas
 Capital punishment in the United States
 List of people executed by lethal injection
 List of people executed in Texas, 1990–1999
 List of serial killers in the United States

References 

1971 births
1999 deaths
20th-century American criminals
20th-century executions by Texas
20th-century executions of American people
American male criminals
Executed American serial killers
Executed people from Texas
Male serial killers
People convicted of murder by Texas
People executed by Texas by lethal injection